Gegić is a Serbian, Bosniak and Croatian surname that is derived from Albanian ethnic subgroup of Ghegs.

Notable people 
Abdulah Gegić (1924–2008), Yugoslav football coach who also had Turkish citizenship
Almir Gegić (born 1979), Serbian Bosniak football player
Amar Gegić, Bosnian professional basketball player
Bajro Gegić, Serbian Bosniak politician
Miroslav Gegić, Serbian football defender
Šemsudin Gegić, Bosniak literate, playwright, theater, TV and film director

References

Serbian surnames
Croatian surnames